Ribes rotundifolium is a North American species of currant known by the common names wild gooseberry and Appalachian gooseberry. It is native to the eastern United States, primarily the Adirondacks, from Massachusetts and the Appalachian Mountains south as far as South Carolina and Tennessee.

Berries are sweet, tasty pale purple berries.

References

External links
 
 Carolina Nature

rotundifolium
Plants described in 1803
Flora of the Eastern United States